The Fresh River is a  stream in southeastern New Hampshire in the United States. It is a tributary of the Piscassic River, which flows into the Lamprey River and is part of the Great Bay and Piscataqua River watershed leading to the Atlantic Ocean.

Nearly the entire course of the river is through freshwater wetlands. It rises on the border between the towns of Epping and Brentwood and flows east into the northern corner of Exeter. The river crosses into Newfields just before joining the Piscassic River at the Piscassic Ice Pond.

See also

List of rivers of New Hampshire

References

Rivers of New Hampshire
Rivers of Rockingham County, New Hampshire